BOW as an acronym may refer to:

 Bag of waters, amniotic sac
 Bartow Municipal Airport (IATA:BOW), a public use airport near Bartow, Florida, United States
 Basic operating weight of an aircraft

See also
 Bow (disambiguation)